Wolfe Island may refer to:
Wolfe Island (Ontario), in Lake Ontario, near Kingston, Ontario, Canada
Wolfe Island (Nova Scotia), in the Atlantic Ocean near Nova Scotia, Canada

See also
 Wolf Island (disambiguation)